Kickin' It With The Kinks, is a 2016 Rwandan documentary short film directed by Cynthia Butare as a self-funded film with Mundia Situmbeko and Selina Thompson. 

In 2011, Butare made the short Kickin' It With The Kinks for her university project. The film receiving a prize for best documentary in her department. Later in 2016, Cynthia along with her friend Mundia, decided to produce a longer version of the film. The film received critical acclaim and screened at several international film festivals.

The film received positive reviews and won several awards at international film festivals.

References

External links
 Kickin' It With The Kinks on YouTube

2016 films
2016 short documentary films
Rwandan short documentary films